Tifu is a surname. Notable people with the surname include:

 Anna Tifu (born 1986), Italian classical violinist
 Yannick Tifu (born 1984), Canadian ice hockey player

See also
 Wang Tifu (1911–2001), a diplomat of Manchuria, for whom Tifu was a given name